Shaad Randhawa (born 21 November 1978) is an Indian actor.  In 2006, Shaad made his film debut with Mohit Suri's Woh Lamhe. He is the son of Indian wrestler and actor Randhawa and Malika (sister of actress Mumtaz).

Career
Shaad started his career with Bollywood film Woh Lamhe as  Nikhil Rai. After that he played in Awarapan, Dhoom Dadakaa, Rokkk and Aashiqui 2. Shashi Ranjan's Dhoom Dadakka was Shaad's first film where he played the lead role. Shaad made his TV debut with Ekta Kapoor's Chandrakanta, where he played the role of Swayam.

Filmography

Television

References

External links
 
 

Living people
Male actors from Mumbai
Male actors in Hindi cinema
21st-century Indian male actors
Indian male film actors
1978 births